Guayabero is a Guahiban language that is spoken by a thousand people in Colombia.  Many of its speakers are monoglots, with few fluent Spanish speakers in the population.

Phonology 
Guayabero has 6 vowels: /a, e, i, ɨ, o, u/.

References

Languages of Colombia
Guajiboan languages